Back of My Lac' is the debut studio album from American R&B singer J. Holiday that was released in the United States on October 2, 2007, by Music Line Group and Capitol Records. Production for this album was handled by Los Da Mystro, Darkchild, The-Dream, The Platinum Brothers, Donnie Scantz, Travis Cherry, J.U.S.T.I.C.E. League, Sean Garrett and Oak Felder

The album was supported by three singles, "Be with Me", "Bed" and "Suffocate".

Upon its release, Back of My Lac''' received generally mixed reviews from music critics. The album debuted at number five on the US Billboard 200, selling 105,000 copies in its first week. The album was nominated for Best Contemporary R&B Album at the 51st Grammy Awards, but lost to Mary J. Blige's Growing Pains.

Background
In early 2000s, he met Corey Green whom he found was in the same direction with him. Soon both formed a duo called 295 that experienced mild popularity. All the while Corey would hook them up with music executives that come to Washington just to watch their performances. They soon got frustrated for not getting discovered and eventually disbanded in 2003 while remaining friends until Holiday's solo career. Holiday would soon secure a record deal with Jazze Pha's Sho'nuff Records.

The album was originally meant to be released by the end of 2006, however it was pushed back to early 2007 and then pushed to its final release of October 2. J. Holiday worked with Ne-Yo on three songs between December 2005 and January 2006 that did not make the album.

 Singles 
The album's lead single, "Be with Me", was released on October 31, 2006. The song was produced by Rodney "Darkchild" Jerkins. The song did not fare well commercially, failing to chart on the Billboard Hot 100 and has since peaked at #83 on the Hot R&B/Hip-Hop Songs.

The second single, "Bed", was released on June 19, 2007, it peaked at number 5 on the U.S. Billboard Hot 100 and number one on Hot R&B/Hip Hop Songs for five weeks total and was certified gold by the Recording Industry Association of America (RIAA).

The third single, "Suffocate" was released on October 2, 2007, the song has peaked at #2 on the Hot R&B/Hip-Hop Songs Chart and #18 on the Billboard Hot 100. The video for the single was shot in Paris, France and debuted on BET's 106 & Park on November 7, 2007.

"City Boy" featuring 8 Ball & MJG was released as a promotional single, the song was not included in the US version of the album, but is featured on the album only as a bonus track in several countries.

"Come Here" was released as a single but was ultimately canceled.

 Critical reception Back of My Lac received mixed reviews from critics. Mark Edward Nero from About.com reviewed the album favorably, saying: "It's rare that young artist puts out such a well-rounded album, one that young men can totally relate to and that young women will be swept off their feet by, but Back of My Lac''', is just such an album. It's charming, gritty, sensual, original and most of all-real. Ladies and gentlemen, J. Holiday has arrived. And he definitely is that dude."

Fan reviews remain highly favorable for the album, praising its overall consistency and well roundness. "Fatal", "Bed","Thank You" and "Suffocate" have been frequently referenced as favorites.

Commercial performance 
The album debuted on the U.S. Billboard 200 chart at number 5, selling 105,000 copies in its first week. It debuted at #1 on the Top R&B/Hip-Hop Albums. The album debuted in the Top 20 R&B/Hip Hop albums in Canada and charted within the Top 100 albums in Canada.  It became a Top 10 R&B/Hip Hop album in the UK and a Top 40 UK album entry peaking at #32. In the U.S it also made it to #8 on the Tastemakers chart and #5 on the Top Digital Albums and Billboard Comprehensive Albums Chart.

Track listing

Charts

Weekly charts

Year-end charts

Release history

Certifications and sales

References

External links 
 J. Holiday's Official Site
 J. Holiday's Myspace Page
 J. Holiday Fan Site
  J. Holiday Live Rooftop Show
  J. Holiday Releases Third Single "Suffocate"
  Back Of My 'Lac Cover,  Tracklisting, and Chocolate City MixTape
  Exclusive Interview with J. Holiday
 J. Holiday - Suffocate Video
 Video Stills of Suffocate Video
 City Boy - Unreleased Track

2007 debut albums
Albums produced by Rodney Jerkins
Capitol Records albums
J. Holiday albums
Albums produced by J.U.S.T.I.C.E. League
Albums produced by Oak Felder